Martin Huston (February 8, 1941 – August 8, 2001) was an American television and theatre actor.

Life and career 
Huston was born in Lexington, Kentucky. He and his family moved to New York, where Huston attended Columbia University. He began his career in 1951, appearing in the anthology television series Lux Video Theatre. In 1953, Huston starred in the title role of the radio and television sitcom My Son Jeep,

In 1955 to 1956 Huston starred as Skipper in the television series Jungle Jim. He also starred in two more television shows, Too Young to Go Steady and Diagnosis: Unknown. Huston made his theatrical debut in 1959 in the Broadway play, titled, Only in America. Other theatre credits include Come Blow Your Horn, Take Her, She's Mine and A Race of Hairy Men!.

Huston’s last theatre credit was in the title role of the 1970 Broadway play Norman, Is That You?. He retired in 1971.

Death 
Huston died in August 2001 of cancer in Manhattan, New York, at the age of 60.

References

External links 

1941 births
2001 deaths
People from Lexington, Kentucky
Male actors from Kentucky
American male child actors
American male television actors
American male stage actors
20th-century American male actors
Columbia University alumni
Deaths from cancer in New York (state)